Kuzey Güney  is a Turkish television drama series. The scenarists are Ece Yörenç and Melek Gençoğlu. The series stars Kıvanç Tatlıtuğ as Kuzey Tekinoğlu, a tough and rebellious son of an Istanbul baker, who comes back from prison four years after he confesses to a crime his brother, Güney, (Buğra Gülsoy) committed.

The series was broadcast on channel Kanal D in Turkey and produced by Ay Yapım. It premiered on September 7, 2011.
Kuzey Güney aired on Wednesday at 8 pm (EEST, UTC+03:00) on Kanal D and from episode 61 onwards at 10 pm (EEST). The final episode was aired on June 26, 2013, after 80 episodes and 2 seasons.

Plot 
Kuzey (Kıvanç Tatlıtuğ) and Güney (Buğra Gülsüy) are brothers with the different characters, Kuzey is the rebellious with the good and noble heart while Güney is calm, The rivalry between the two brothers reaches a boiling point when they both fall in love with the same girl who is named Cemre (Öykü Karayel). A tragic event drives the girl into the arms of one, while the other must bounce back from insurmountable odds.

Series overview

Cast and characters

Main 
 Kıvanç Tatlıtuğ as Kuzey Tekinoğlu, a tough and rebellious son (who inherited the anger from his father), of an Istanbul baker Sami who feel his pain he had the noble and kind heart from inside, he later turned into a bold boxer.
 Buğra Gülsoy as Güney Tekinoğlu, Kuzey's brother and a calm young man, who later become rich businessman, his mother feel his pain.
 Öykü Karayel as Cemre Çayak, love interest of Kuzey and Güney, she was raised by her mother.

Supporting 
 Bade İşçil as Banu Sinaner, Güney's wife, she suicided in pregnancy through jumping from the hospital building in front of Güney.
 Zerrin Tekindor as Gülten Çayak, hairdresser, Cemre's mother.
 Mustafa Avkıran as  'Sami' Tekinoğlu, father of Kuzey and Güney, connected more to Kuzey.
 Semra Dinçer as Handan Tekinoğlu, Kuzey and Güney's mother, connected more to Güney later as well to Kuzey.
 Ertan Dönmez as Kazim, shop owner, Cemre's father and Gülten's first love interest.
 Hazar Ergüçlü as Simay Canaş, Kuzey's ex-wife.
 Çağdaş Onur Öztürk as Barış Hakmen, Banu's maternal half-brother, he started troubles for Kuzey and Cemre, he hates Güney from the first time he watch him.
 Hale Soygazi as Ebru Sinaner, Banu and Barış's mother and Burak's step mother.
 Turgay Kantürk as Ferhat, worst enemy of Kuzey, who killed Ali, later he was killed by Güney.
 Merve Boluğur as Zeynep, daughter of Huseyin the photographer, fell in love with Kuzey.
 Rıza Kocaoğlu as Ali Güntan, closer friend and a companion to Kuzey, killed by Ferhat.
 Serhat Teoman as Burak Çatalcalı, Banu's paternal half-brother.
 Göksen Ateş as Venüs Tezerel, Barış's girlfriend, also had an affair with Burak.
 Kaan Tasaner as Şeref, a police detective who looks after Kuzey, for caughting Ferhat.

International Broadcast
This series was also telecast in Pakistan on Urdu 1 with great TRPs in Urdu dubbed and was being broadcast on Iranian television channel GEM TV dubbed in Persian language under the same name. In Indian Zindagi TV it was dubbed in Hindi.

Awards

References

Serial drama television series
Television series by Ay Yapım
2011 Turkish television series debuts
2013 Turkish television series endings
Turkish television series based on American television series
Turkish-language television shows
Kanal D original programming
Television shows set in Istanbul
Television series produced in Istanbul
Television series set in the 2010s